The Narrows is a 1953 novel by African-American writer Ann Petry. The name "The Narrows" is the African-American section of the fictional town of Monmouth, Connecticut, in which most of the novel's action takes place.

Though less famous than Petry's earlier novel, The Street, The Narrows is her longest novel and, critic Hilary Holladay argues, her most complex: “The Narrows represents the full flowering of Petry’s preoccupation with human relationships.”

The novel is written in the third person, narrated from the perspective of several different characters, often in flashback episodes.

Setting

The epigraph in The Narrows from Henry V suggests that Shakespeare’s history play is the inspiration for the fictional town name of Monmouth, Connecticut:

“... I tell you, captain, if you look in the maps of the ’orld, I warrant you sall find, in the comparisons between Macedon and Monmouth, that the situations, look you, is both alike. There is a river in Macedon; and there is also moreover a river at Monmouth: it is called Wye at Monmouth; but it is out of my prains what is the name of the other river; but ’tis all one, ’tis alike as my fingers is to my fingers, and there is salmons in both.” (Fluellen, King Henry V, Act IV, vii)

“The Narrows” itself, as a neighborhood within Monmouth, is also called by the names “Eye of the Needle, The Bottom, Little Harlem, Dark Town, Niggertown—because Negroes had replaced those earlier immigrants, the Irish, the Italians and the Poles.”

Characters

Abbie Crunch—A widow living in a house on Dumble Street, in The Narrows. She is concerned with propriety and racial uplift.
Link Williams—Abbie's adopted son, twenty-six years old during the novel's present-day action. Link majored in history at Dartmouth but has been working in The Last Chance (a bar in The Narrows) since graduation, much to Abbie's disappointment.
Malcolm Powther—Abbie's boarder, also the butler at the Treadway estate. He is a neat, little man who knows of his wife's affairs but does not confront her.
Mamie Powther—Malcolm's wife, a buxom woman who sings the blues. Abbie disapproves of her.
J.C. Powther—Malcolm and Mamie's youngest son, who spends his days pestering Abbie.
Bill Hod—Owner of The Last Chance, as well as other bars and brothels in The Narrows. He is Mamie's lover and something of a surrogate father to Link.
Camilla (“Camilo”) Treadway Sheffield—Link's white lover, only heir to the Treadway estate. She is married to Captain Bunny Sheffield and works as a fashion reporter.
Mrs. Treadway—Owner (after her husband's death) of Treadway Munitions, the main industry in Monmouth.
Captain “Bunny” Sheffield—Camilla's husband, Mrs. Treadway's son-in-law.
Jubine—Photographer with socialist views. His pictures catch the poor at their most noble and the rich at their most embarrassing moments.
Peter Bullock—Editor of the Monmouth Chronicle. He suffers from ulcers, partly because of the stress of maintaining his upper-middle-class lifestyle.

Plot summary

The novel's non-flashback narrative arc occurs within the period of a few months. At the beginning of this time, the Powthers move in as Abbie Crunch's boarders. The main action begins when Link “rescues” Camilla Treadway Sheffield (who gives her name as “Camilo Williams”) from the advances of Cat Jimmie, a disabled veteran. Link does not realize that Camilo is white until later in the evening.

Eventually, Link and Camilo begin a clandestine affair, primarily meeting in New York, though sometimes spending the night in Abbie's house in The Narrows. On one of these occasions, Abbie finds the two in bed together and angrily throws Camilo out of the house. Link finds out, when Bill Hod leaves an old newspaper around for him to see, that Camilo is really Camilla Treadway Sheffield; in other words, not only is she white, but she is also rich and married. Link fears that Camilo is merely repeating a pattern from the days of slavery: “I bid two hundred; look at his teeth, make it three hundred; look at his muscle, look at his back; the lady says one thousand dollars. Sold to the lady for a thousand dollars. Plantation buck. Stud.”

He breaks off the relationship with Camilla, but she is convinced that he must be seeing another woman. In revenge, she screams and tears her clothing, accusing him of attempted rape when the police arrive. There is little circumstantial evidence for her accusation and, in the intervening time before the trial, Camilla begins drinking too much. One day, while driving intoxicated, she hits a child with her car (thereby destroying what credibility she might have had in court). Her mother, Mrs. Treadway, bribes Peter Bullock to keep the story out of the newspaper. However, Mrs. Treadway and Captain Sheffield still want to assure Camilla's victory in court, so they kidnap Link and try to make him sign a confession. When he “confesses” that he and Camilla were in love, Captain Sheffield shoots and kills him.

In the aftermath of Link's murder, Mrs. Treadway and Captain Sheffield are arrested. Abbie, however, realizes that Bill Hod will not rest until Camilla has paid for her part in Link's death. At the end of the novel, she resolves to go to the police, tell them of her suspicions, and therefore end the chain of violence. She takes J.C. Powther along with her, symbolizing her “adoption” of him and her resolve to care for him as she had failed to do for Link.

Notes

Novels by Ann Petry
1953 American novels
African-American novels
Novels set in Connecticut
Houghton Mifflin books